José Manuel Jurado Marín (born 29 June 1986) is a Spanish former professional footballer who played as a central midfielder.

He played for both major teams in Madrid during his career, Real and Atlético, albeit with no success for the former. He amassed La Liga totals of 186 games and 22 goals over eight seasons, also representing in the competition Mallorca and Espanyol.

In 2010, Jurado signed for Schalke 04, going on to appear in 71 competitive matches in two years and win two major trophies, including the 2011 German Cup. He additionally had spells in Russia with Spartak, and England with Watford.

Club career

Real Madrid
Born in Sanlúcar de Barrameda, Cádiz, Jurado was a product of Real Madrid's youth system, and was one of Real Madrid Castilla's most important players alongside Javi García.

He made his official debut for the senior team on 29 October 2005 in a 2–0 away win against Real Betis, and made six first-team appearances during his tenure, also taking the field against Olympiacos F.C. in the season's UEFA Champions League.

Atlético Madrid

On 4 August 2006, Jurado moved to city rivals Atlético Madrid for a reported fee of €3 million, signing a four-year contract. However, like with Álvaro Arbeloa before him, Real Madrid included a "special clause" in Jurado's contract, having the option of buying him back at the end of the 2007–08 campaign for €6 million.

After playing 33 league games in 2006–07, mainly due to serious injuries to teammates Maxi Rodríguez and Martin Petrov, Jurado featured sparingly the following season, and was loaned to RCD Mallorca in July 2008. After outstanding performances during 2008–09 and finishing as the Balearic Islands side's second top scorer, he was recalled by the Colchoneros.

On 10 November 2009, Jurado put pen to paper a new contract with Atlético, keeping him at the club until the summer of 2013. He celebrated his new deal by scoring the opening goal of the 6–0 demolition of UD Marbella in the Copa del Rey, in the same evening.

During the 2009–10 campaign, Jurado – still not an undisputed starter – was the player with the most official matches for the team, with a total of 64. He also netted nine times overall as they reached the finals of both the Spanish Cup and the UEFA Europa League, and came on as a substitute in the final of the latter competition.

Jurado started 2010–11 playing eight minutes in the UEFA Super Cup win against Inter Milan. On 30 August, he opened the scoring as Atlético defeated Sporting de Gijón 4–0 at home; however, the following day, he was transferred to FC Schalke 04 in Germany for €13 million, reuniting with former Real Madrid teammate Raúl.

Schalke 04

On 4 December 2010, Jurado scored his first Bundesliga goal for Schalke, helping to a 2–0 home win against FC Bayern Munich. The following game he netted the first in a 2–1 victory at S.L. Benfica – after a chest pass from Raúl – for the Champions League group stage, which earned the club the first position after the final round; the roles reversed in the quarterfinals second leg 2–1 home triumph against Inter (7–3 on aggregate), as the midfielder assisted the forward in the opening goal, and the team ended their European campaign in the semi-finals with Jurado scoring their consolation in a 1–6 aggregate loss to Manchester United.

Jurado finished his only full season with the Gelsenkirchen side with 44 appearances and eight goals all competitions comprised. One of those came in the final of the German Cup, a 5–0 rout of MSV Duisburg.

Spartak Moscow
On 4 September 2012, Jurado was loaned to FC Spartak Moscow in the Russian Premier League, in a season-long move. The move was made permanent only two months later, being rendered effective the following summer. 

Jurado recorded eight goals in 29 games in the 2013–14 campaign, starting on 27 July 2013 with a brace in the Oldest Russian derby, a 4–1 win at city rivals FC Dynamo Moscow. In the reverse fixture, which was also the last matchday, he started a comeback from 0–2 down to 3–2.

Watford and Espanyol
On 22 July 2015, Jurado signed for newly promoted Premier League team Watford on a three-year deal for an undisclosed fee, reuniting with his compatriot and former Atlético manager Quique Sánchez Flores. He made his debut in the season opener on 8 August, starting in a 2–2 draw at Everton, and played 30 games for the eventual semi-finalists of the FA Cup without scoring.

On 5 July 2016, Jurado returned to his homeland for the first time in six years, signing for RCD Espanyol again under Flores.

Later career
On 21 June 2018, Jurado moved to Al Ahli Saudi FC of the Saudi Professional League. The following 28 February, he joined China League One side Changchun Yatai FC.

Jurado returned to Spain on 22 July 2019, with the 33-year-old agreeing to a three-year contract with Segunda División's Cádiz CF as a free agent.

International career
Jurado played for Spain at under-16, under-17, under-19 and under-21 levels, and represented the nation at the 2003 FIFA U-17 World Championship and the 2009 UEFA European Under-21 Championship.

Club statistics

Honours
Atlético Madrid
UEFA Europa League: 2009–10
UEFA Super Cup: 2010
UEFA Intertoto Cup: 2007
Copa del Rey runner-up: 2009–10

Schalke 04
DFB-Pokal: 2010–11
DFL-Supercup: 2011

References

External links

Spartak official profile

1986 births
Living people
People from Sanlúcar de Barrameda
Sportspeople from the Province of Cádiz
Spanish footballers
Footballers from Andalusia
Association football midfielders
La Liga players
Segunda División players
Segunda División B players
Real Madrid Castilla footballers
Real Madrid CF players
Atlético Madrid footballers
RCD Mallorca players
RCD Espanyol footballers
Cádiz CF players
Bundesliga players
FC Schalke 04 players
Russian Premier League players
FC Spartak Moscow players
Premier League players
Watford F.C. players
Saudi Professional League players
Al-Ahli Saudi FC players
China League One players
Changchun Yatai F.C. players
UEFA Europa League winning players
Spain youth international footballers
Spain under-21 international footballers
Spanish expatriate footballers
Expatriate footballers in Germany
Expatriate footballers in Russia
Expatriate footballers in England
Expatriate footballers in Saudi Arabia
Expatriate footballers in China
Spanish expatriate sportspeople in Germany
Spanish expatriate sportspeople in Russia
Spanish expatriate sportspeople in England
Spanish expatriate sportspeople in Saudi Arabia
Spanish expatriate sportspeople in China